Steven Grae Regeling (born 2 October 1959) is an Australian former motorcycle speedway rider who rode in the British League for Leicester Lions in the early 1980s and later for Kings Lynn Stars, before riding for several years in the National League for the Exeter Falcons and Middlesbrough Bears. He won the Australian Championship in 1987.

Biography
Regeling was born in 1959 in Mount Isa, Queensland, Australia. His initial experience was in short track racing, in which his father and older brother had also competed. He then moved into speedway in Brisbane in the late 1970s with the famous Brisbane Exhibition Ground being his home track.

He was signed by Martin Rogers for the Leicester Lions in 1980, but suffered a broken leg at Swindon at the start of the season. After recovering he was loaned out to the National League team Workington Comets, and impressive performances saw him recalled to ride for the Lions before the season ended. After being loaned out to Boston Barracudas in 1981, where he averaged 8.51 from 18 matches, he became a regular rider for the Lions in the two years that followed, until the club folded.

He then moved on to the King's Lynn Stars in 1984 and also represented Australia at international level.

After finishing fourth in 1986, Regeling won the Australian championship in 1987 and finished runner-up to Phil Crump the following year.

He later rode for the Exeter Falcons, for whom he was the number one rider for the whole of the 1990 season. At the end of the 1991 season he requested a transfer and moved to Middlesbrough, where his success continued, averaging over 8.7 in the 1992 season with two full maximum scores. His final season in Britain was in 1993.

Regeling represented Australia on numerous occasions in test matches at both home and abroad, and also in World Championship competitions such as the World Pairs Championship and World Team Cup.

Career record

British leagues

World Final Appearances

World Pairs Championship
 1985 -  Rybnik, Rybnik Municipal Stadium (with Phil Crump) - 6th - 11pts (6)
 1986 -  Pocking, Rottalstadion (with Phil Crump) - 9th - 15pts (5)
 1987 -  Pardubice, Svítkov Stadion (with Steve Baker) - 7th - 21pts (5)

World Team Cup
Regeling was part of the Australia team in 1991. They finished second to eventual runners-up Sweden in the group stage, with Regeling top scorer for the team with 11 points.

References

1959 births
Australian speedway riders
Leicester Lions riders
Living people
People from Mount Isa